Lars Moe (born 30 April 1951) is a Norwegian veterinarian.

He was born in Sandefjord, and took the dr.scient. degree in 1986. He was hired at the Norwegian School of Veterinary Science in 1978, became professor in 1998, and has served as rector there since 2002. He stepped down in 2010, and his former deputy Yngvild Wasteson took over.

References

1951 births
Living people
Norwegian veterinarians
Academic staff of the Norwegian School of Veterinary Science
Rectors of the Norwegian School of Veterinary Science
People from Sandefjord